The Bayer designation d Cancri is shared by two star systems in the constellation Cancer:

 d1 Cancri (20 Cancri)
 d2 Cancri (25 Cancri)

See also
 δ Cancri

Cancri, d
Cancer (constellation)